is a Japanese alpine skier. He competed in slalom at the 1994 and 1998 Winter Olympics.

References

External links
 

1973 births
Living people
People from Tokyo
Japanese male alpine skiers
Olympic alpine skiers of Japan
Alpine skiers at the 1994 Winter Olympics
Alpine skiers at the 1998 Winter Olympics
20th-century Japanese people